Terminalia fitzgeraldii is a tree of the family Combretaceae native to Western Australia.

It blooms between July and December producing white-yellow flowers.

It is found in rocky creek beds and on alluvial plains in the Kimberley region of Western Australia growing in lateritic clay soils.

References

Trees of Australia
Flora of Western Australia
Plants described in 1923
fitzgeraldii